The 1962 Oklahoma State Cowboys football team represented Oklahoma State University–Stillwater in the Big Eight Conference during the 1962 NCAA University Division football season. In their eighth and final season under head coach Cliff Speegle, the Cowboys compiled a 4–6 record (2–5 against conference opponents), finished in sixth place in the conference, and were outscored by opponents by a combined total of 214 to 138.

On offense, the 1962 team averaged 13.8 points scored, 152.7 rushing yards, and 110.2 passing yards per game.  On defense, the team allowed an average of 21.4 points scored, 261.8 rushing yards, and 97.0 passing yards per game. The team's statistical leaders included Don Derrick with 539 rushing yards and 24 yards, Mike Miller with 1,056 passing yards, and Don Karns with 328 receiving yards.

No Oklahoma State players were selected as first-team All-Big Eight Conference players.

The team played its home games at Lewis Field in Stillwater, Oklahoma.

Schedule

References

Oklahoma State
Oklahoma State Cowboys football seasons
Oklahoma State Cowboys football